An Clasach Ó Cobhthaigh (died 1415) was an Irish poet.

A member of the Ó Cobhthaigh bardic family, An Clasach is noted in the Oxford Dictionary of National Biography as "a famous poet and man of learning." He had sons Maeleachlainn Ó Cobhthaigh (died 1429) and Domhnall Ó Cobhthaigh (died 1446), who were also poets.

References

 Ó Cobhthaigh family, pp. 435–436, in Oxford Dictionary of National Biography, volume 41, Norbury-Osbourne, September 2004.

Medieval Irish poets
Irish male poets
People from County Westmeath
15th-century Irish poets
1415 deaths
Year of birth unknown